The Jubilee Parkway is a pair of parallel concrete viaduct bridges that carry Interstate 10 across Mobile Bay from the George Wallace Tunnel on Blakeley Island in Mobile, Alabama eastbound to Spanish Fort/Daphne, Alabama. The bridges are similar in design to the pre-Hurricane Katrina I-10 Twin Span Bridge near New Orleans, Louisiana. The parkway was completed in 1978 and crosses the northern portion of Mobile Bay, running roughly parallel to the nearby Battleship Parkway, with which it has an interchange. It was named for the jubilee phenomenon that occurs intermittently in Mobile Bay, but is commonly referred to locally and in the media as the "Bayway".

Expansion

This is intended to eliminate the current traffic bottleneck on I-10 at the tunnel, but is very controversial locally due to the proposed bridge's potential visual and economic impact on the city.

Incidents
One of the largest multi-vehicle collisions in U.S. history took place on the Parkway on the morning of March 20, 1995.  Caused by fog on Mobile Bay, the accident involved around 200 vehicles, killed one person, and injured more than 90 others.

During the ice storm of January 28–30, 2014, the Bayway was closed several times for hours, diverting traffic onto the Causeway, while ALDOT crews used grading equipment to remove ice from the roadway. Asked why the Bayway wasn't sanded or salted, ALDOT officials said that they did not have the spreader equipment since ice storms occur in the area only about once every 20 years.

References

Bridges in Mobile, Alabama
Bridges completed in 1978
Mobile Bay
Interstate 10
Road bridges in Alabama
Bridges on the Interstate Highway System
Concrete bridges in the United States
Girder bridges in the United States